Augusto Claudio G. Cuello  is Professor in the Department of Pharmacology and Therapeutics and Charles E. Frosst/Merck Chair in Pharmacology at McGill University in Montreal, Quebec, Canada.

Biography 
He obtained his Doctor of Medicine (M.D.) in 1965 from the University of Buenos Aires in Argentina, followed by a Doctor of Science (D.Sc.) at Oxford University in 1986 for outstanding contributions to the field of neuroscience.

He was Professor in Neuropharmacology at Oxford University.

In October 2003, he was named the Charles E. Frosst/Merck Chair in Pharmacology at McGill University.

Honours 
In 1997, he was received as a fellow of the Royal Society of Canada in the Academy of Science.

References

Internal link 
Charles Frosst

Living people
Year of birth missing (living people)
Alumni of the University of Oxford
University of Buenos Aires alumni
Academic staff of McGill University
Fellows of the Royal Society of Canada
Officers of the Order of Canada